The Gulf Islands Film and Television School (GIFTS) is a film school located on Galiano Island off the west coast of British Columbia, Canada near Vancouver. GIFTS offers hands-on media training programs and teen summer camps. It was initially founded by George Harris in 1995, but was purchased by Evan Allen and Barbara Allen in 2014.

References

External links
Official website
Mass Effect Games

Film schools in Canada
Cinema of British Columbia